Niz Goenkar Revolution Front is a political party in Goa, India. It was created in 2016 in light of the 2017 Goa Legislative Assembly election.

It advocates for special status for Goa.

References

Political parties in India